The 2017–18 Coupe de France preliminary rounds, Occitanie make up the qualifying competition to decide which teams from the French Occitanie region take part in the main competition from the seventh round.

First round 
The first round in the Midi-Pyrénées sector was organised by individual districts. The matches were played on 18, 19 and 20 August 2017.

First round results: Midi-Pyrénées, District de l'Ariège

First round results: Midi-Pyrénées, District de l'Aveyron

First round results: Midi-Pyrénées, District de Haute-Garonne

First round results: Midi-Pyrénées, District du Gers

First round results: Midi-Pyrénées, District des Hautes-Pyrénées

First round results: Midi-Pyrénées, District du Lot

First round results: Midi-Pyrénées, District du Tarn

First round results: Midi-Pyrénées, District du Tarn-et-Garonne

Languedoc-Roussillon 
The matches in Languedoc-Roussillon were played on 18, 19 and 20 August 2017.

First round results: Languedoc-Roussillon

Second round

Midi-Pyrénées 
The second round in the Midi-Pyrénées sector is organised by individual districts. The matches were played on 25, 26 and 27 August 2017.

Second round results: Midi-Pyrénées, District de l'Ariège

Second round results: Midi-Pyrénées, District de l'Aveyron

Second round results: Midi-Pyrénées, District de Haute-Garonne

Second round results: Midi-Pyrénées, District du Gers

Second round results: Midi-Pyrénées, District des Hautes-Pyrénées

Second round results: Midi-Pyrénées, District du Lot

Second round results: Midi-Pyrénées, District du Tarn

Second round results: Midi-Pyrénées, District du Tarn-et-Garonne

Languedoc-Roussillon 
These matches were played on 25, 26 and 27 August 2017.

Second round results: Languedoc-Roussillon

Third round

Midi-Pyrénées 

These matches were played on 8, 9 and 10 September 2017.

Third round results: Midi-Pyrénées

Languedoc-Roussillon 
These matches were played on 9 and 10 September 2017.

Third round results: Languedoc-Roussillon

Fourth round

Midi-Pyrénées 
These matches were played on 23 and 24 September 2017.

Fourth round results: Midi-Pyrénées

Languedoc-Roussillon 
These matches were played on 23 and 24 September 2017.

Fourth round results: Languedoc-Roussillon

Fifth round

Midi-Pyrénées 
These matches were played on 7 October 2017.

Fifth round results: Midi-Pyrénées

Languedoc-Roussillon 
These matches were played on 7 and 8 October 2017.

Fifth round results: Languedoc-Roussillon

Sixth round

Midi-Pyrénées 
These matches were played on 21 October 2017.

Sixth round results: Midi-Pyrénées

Languedoc-Roussillon 
These matches were played on 21 and 22 October 2017.

Sixth round results: Languedoc-Roussillon

Notes

References 

2017–18 Coupe de France